Scotorythra arboricolans is a moth of the family Geometridae. It was first described by Arthur Gardiner Butler in 1883. It is endemic to the Hawaiian islands of Kauai, Oahu, Molokai, Maui, Lanai and Hawaii

The larvae feed on Santalum freycinetianum, Santalum paniculatum and Santalum pyrularium.

External links

arboricolans
Endemic moths of Hawaii
Biota of Kauai
Biota of Maui
Biota of Oahu